Margate Marine & Pier was a ward of Margate Municipal District prior to 1973. When the Municipal District was included in the Thanet Borough in 1974, Marine & Pier ward elected 2 councillors to the new Borough at the elections of 1973 and 1976.

1973 Election

1976 Election

The election of 1979 was fought on revised boundaries and Margate Marine & Pier ward had been split between Marine and Pier wards, each electing one councillors.

Margate